Argenta  may refer to:

People
 Argenta (surname)

Places
 Argenta, British Columbia, Canada, a settlement
 Argenta, Emilia–Romagna, Italy, a town and comune in the province of Ferrara
 Argenta, Illinois, United States, a village
 Argenta, Montana, United States, a census-designated place
 Argenta Historic District, North Little Rock, Arkansas, United States, on the National Register of Historic Places

Other uses
 HMS Argenta, a prison ship of the British Armed Forces Royal Navy
 Argenta (bank), a Belgian bank
 Fiat Argenta, an Italian car